TV8 Mont-Blanc is a Savoie-based local television channel, broadcast on Télévision Numérique Terrestre, cable and satellite.

External links

TV8 Mont-Blanc at LyngSat Address
TV8MontBlanc Youtube Channel

References

Television channels and stations established in 1989
Television stations in France
French-language television stations